Maruddana is a village in Sri Lanka. It is located within Central Province.

History
Maruddana village history was run way back to the Kingdom of Senkadagala. "Dodamgasthenna Purana Viharaya" is also old more than 600 years. People in the Maruddana always visiting this temple to worship.

The route to Maruddana from Kandy Town
You drive down to Katugasthota on A9 road and turn left to Puttalam A10 route and passed about 10 kilometers, you will meet the Arambekade Junction. Turn right into Bokkawala B15 road and go 04 kilometers towards to Walathenna junction and turn right nearby Dodgamgasthenna Viharaya to enter to the Maruddana.

See also
List of towns in Central Province, Sri Lanka

External links

List of Grama Niladhari Divisions in Poojapitiya Divisional Secretariat

Populated places in Kandy District